The 1998 Sunderland Council election took place on 7 May 1998 to elect members of Sunderland Metropolitan Borough Council in Tyne and Wear, England. One third of the council was up for election and the Labour Party stayed in overall control of the council.

After the election, the composition of the council was:
Labour 68
Conservative 4
Liberal Democrat 2
Liberal 1

Election result
Overall turnout in the election was 18%.

References

1998 English local elections
1998
20th century in Tyne and Wear